Buckasura is a 2018 Indian Kannada psychological thriller film written by Rajasimha Tadinada and directed by Navaneeth and produced by R. J. Rohith, marking their second collaboration after Karvva (2016). It features RJ Rohith and Kavya Gowda along with V. Ravichandran in the lead antagonist role. The supporting cast includes Sithara, Suchendra Prasad, Shashikumar and Makarand Deshpande among others. The score and soundtrack for the film is by Avinash Sreeram and the cinematography is by Mohan. The film released on 27 April 2018. The movie was reported to be loosely inspired by the 1997 American movie The Devil's Advocate.

Cast 
 RJ Rohith as  Arya (Money)
 Kavya Gowda
 V. Ravichandran as Chakaravrthy 
 Shashikumar
 Sithara
 Saikumar
 Makarand Deshpande
 Pavithra Lokesh
 Suchendra Prasad
 Sadhu Kokila
 Sihi Kahi Chandru
 Vijay Chendoor

Soundtrack

The film's background score and the soundtracks are composed by Avinash Sreeram. The music rights were acquired by Ananda Audio.

References

External links
 

2010s Kannada-language films
Indian psychological thriller films
2018 psychological thriller films
Indian courtroom films
Films about social issues in India
Indian legal films
Social realism in film